Electric Guitarist is the fourth solo album by guitarist John McLaughlin, released in 1978 through Columbia Records originally on vinyl; a remastered CD was issued in 1990 as part of the Columbia Jazz Contemporary Masters series. Among McLaughlin’s former collaborators appearing on the album are drummers Tony Williams, Jack DeJohnette and Billy Cobham, keyboardist Chick Corea, alto saxophonist David Sanborn, violinist Jerry Goodman, bassists Jack Bruce, Stanley Clarke and Fernando Saunders and fellow guitarist Carlos Santana.

Track listing

Personnel
 John McLaughlin – guitar
"New York on My Mind"
 Jerry Goodman – violin
 Stu Goldberg – Minimoog, electric piano & organ
 Fernando Saunders – bass
 Billy Cobham – drums
"Friendship"
 Carlos Santana – guitar
 Tom Coster – organ
 Neil Jason – bass
 Narada Michael Walden – drums
 Alyrio Lima – percussion
 Armando Peraza – conga
"Every Tear from Every Eye"
 David Sanborn – alto saxophone
 Patrice Rushen – piano
 Alphonso Johnson – bass & Moog Taurus
 Tony Thunder Smith – drums
"Do You Hear the Voices That You Left Behind?"
 Chick Corea – Minimoog & electric piano
 Stanley Clarke – bass
 Jack DeJohnette – drums
"Are You the One? Are You the One?"
 Jack Bruce – bass
 Tony Williams – drums
"Phenomenon - Compulsion"
 Billy Cobham – drums
"My Foolish Heart"
 solo on electric guitar

Chart performance

References

External links 
 John McLaughlin - Electric Guitarist (1978) album review by Hal Horowitz, credits & releases at AllMusic
 John McLaughlin - Electric Guitarist (1978) album releases & credits at Discogs
 John McLaughlin - Electric Guitarist (1978) album to be listened as stream on Spotify

John McLaughlin (musician) albums
1978 albums
Columbia Records albums